Nogometni klub Goričanka Rogašovci, commonly referred to as NK Goričanka or simply Goričanka, is a Slovenian football club which plays its home in the village of Sveti Jurij in the Municipality of Rogašovci. The club was founded in 1977 and traditionally wears red kits, though in recent years the club has also adopted a blue and yellow kits.

The club has built a rivalry with NK Serdica from Serdica mainly due to close proximity to the town of Rogašovci. Matches between the two teams are known as the "Goričko derby".

Honours

Slovenian Fourth Division
 Winners: 1995–96

Slovenian Sixth Division
 Winners: 2005–06, 2010–11

League history since 1991

References

Football clubs in Slovenia
Association football clubs established in 1977
1977 establishments in Slovenia